Schoenus ferrugineus is a species of flowering plant belonging to the family Cyperaceae.

It is native to Europe.

References

ferrugineus